Junior Television Club was a Canadian children's television news magazine series. It was broadcast on CBC Television from Vancouver, British Columbia, between May 1, 1957 and June 26, 1957. The show featured five preteen hosts, including 10-year-old Kim Campbell (then known as Avril Campbell), who later became Canada's first female prime minister.  Campbell moderated discussions on subjects of responsibility, such as pocket money and the use of lipstick, and was also the host for guest performers.

The show aired Wednesdays at 5:00 pm for two months.

External links 
 CBC Archives - Video of former Canadian Prime Minister Kim Campbell on Junior Television Club
 MemorableTV.com
 Queen's University Directory of CBC Television Series (Junior Television Club archived listing link via archive.org)
 

1957 Canadian television series debuts
1957 Canadian television series endings
1950s Canadian children's television series
Black-and-white Canadian television shows
CBC Television original programming
Television shows filmed in Vancouver